Clare Francis Gray (born 3 June 1997) is a Japanese female handball player for Omron Corporation and the Japanese national team.

She represented Japan at the 2021 World Women's Handball Championship in Spain.

References

1997 births
Living people
Japanese female handball players